Moon Moon, New South Wales is a rural locality of Hay Shire Council and a civil parish of Nicholson County. in the Riverina region of Australia.

Moon Moon is located at 33°44′54″S 145°06′04″E,  750 km (460 mi) from Sydney and is on the Lachlan River. The area is dominated by broad acre agriculture, with no towns in the parish boundary.

References

Towns in the Riverina
Lachlan River